Osama—Yo' Mama: The Album is an album released by country music artist Ray Stevens. It was released by Curb Records on February 12, 2002. One single was released from it, which was "Osama-Yo' Mama", which peaked at #48 on the Hot Country Songs chart in 2001 and accounted for Stevens' first chart single since "Power Tools" in 1992. The album reached #29 on the US Top Country Albums chart.

Track listing
 "Osama-Yo' Mama" (C.W. Kalb, Jr., Ray Stevens) - 3:29
 "Hang Up and Drive" (C.W. Kalb, Jr.) – 3:02
 "Safe at Home" (Nick Sibley) – 3:09
 "Freudian Slip" (Stevens) – 3:00
 "Deerslayer" (Stevens, Glenn Fortner) – 4:27
 "Bon Temps Roulette" (C.W. Kalb, Jr.) – 3:36
 "The Hustler" (C.W. Kalb, Jr., Carlene Kalb) – 3:38
 "The Lady on the Radio" (Mike Neun) – 4:05
 "Gone for Good" (C.W. Kalb, Jr.) – 2:50
 "United We Stand" (John Goodison, Tony Hiller) – 2:49

Chart performance

Album

Singles

References

External links

Ray Stevens albums
2002 albums
Curb Records albums